The 1985 Tournament Players Championship was a golf tournament in Florida on the PGA Tour, held  at TPC Sawgrass in Ponte Vedra Beach, southeast of Jacksonville. It was the twelfth Tournament Players Championship.

Calvin Peete shot 66 in the final round for 274 (–14) and the win, three strokes ahead of runner-up  Peete was the only player to break par in all four rounds.

Defending champion Fred Couples finished nineteen strokes back, in a tie for 49th place.

Venue

Field
1. Top 125 players, if PGA Tour members, from Final 1984 Official Money List:

Tom Watson, Mark O'Meara, Andy Bean, Denis Watson, Tom Kite, Bruce Lietzke, Fred Couples, Craig Stadler, Greg Norman, Peter Jacobsen, Payne Stewart, Lee Trevino, Gil Morgan, Curtis Strange, Jack Nicklaus, Ben Crenshaw, Gary Koch, Corey Pavin, Jack Renner, Wayne Levi, John Mahaffey, Scott Simpson, David Edwards, Bob Eastwood, Calvin Peete, Hal Sutton, Scott Hoch, George Archer, Lanny Wadkins, Gary Hallberg, Hale Irwin, Dan Pohl, Hubert Green, Chip Beck, Ronnie Black, Larry Mize, George Burns, Nick Faldo, Tom Purtzer, Fuzzy Zoeller, Tim Simpson, Larry Nelson, Billy Kratzert, Jay Haas, Mike Donald, Johnny Miller, Jim Thorpe, Mike Reid, Mark McCumber, Russ Cochran, Seve Ballesteros, Rex Caldwell, Don Pooley, Buddy Gardner, Roger Maltbie, Doug Tewell, David Graham, Joey Sindelar, Larry Rinker, Willie Wood, Dave Barr, Mike Sullivan, Jim Colbert, D. A. Weibring, Nick Price, Bobby Wadkins, Raymond Floyd, Mark Pfeil, Vance Heafner, Tony Sills, Lon Hinkle, Jim Simons, Bernhard Langer, Jim Nelford, Tommy Nakajima, Keith Fergus, Peter Oosterhuis, John Adams, Ron Streck, Brad Faxon, Ralph Landrum, Isao Aoki, Gibby Gilbert, Gary McCord, Donnie Hammond, Loren Roberts, J. C. Snead, John Cook, Sammy Rachels, Clarence Rose, Mike Nicolette, Tim Norris, Allen Miller, Pat Lindsey, Richard Zokol, Frank Conner, Dan Halldorson, TC Chen, Joe Inman, Danny Edwards, Tom Jenkins, Pat McGowan, Dan Forsman, Howard Twitty, Morris Hatalsky, Phil Hancock, Jim Dent, Barry Jaeckel, Victor Regalado, Ken Brown, David Ogrin, Jodie Mudd, Mark Hayes, Mike Smith, Bobby Clampett, Jerry Pate, Ed Fiori, Mac O'Grady, John Fought, Mark Brooks, Lance Ten Broeck, Tommy Valentine, Brett Upper

Mark Lye and Gary Player did not play

2. Designated players

Bill Rogers

3. Any foreign player meeting the requirements of a designated player, whether or not he is a PGA Tour member

4. Winners in the last 10 calendar years of The Players Championship, PGA Championship, U.S. Open, Masters Tournament, and World Series of Golf (beginning In 1976)

Andy North, Dave Stockton

5. The leader in Senior PGA Tour official earnings of 1984

Don January (did not to play)

6. The three players, not otherwise eligible, designated by the TPC Committee as "special selections"'Arnold Palmer, Lou Graham

7. To complete a field of 144 players, those players in order, not otherwise eligible, from the 1985 Official Money List, as of the completion of the USF&G Classic, March 17, 1985

Woody Blackburn, Bill Glasson, Brad Fabel, Paul Azinger, Sandy Lyle, Andrew Magee, Jay Delsing, Mike Bright, Bob Lohr, Chris Perry, Phil Blackmar, Wayne Grady, Greg Twiggs, Gene Sauers, David Lundstrom

General source:

Round summaries
First roundThursday, March 28, 1985Source:

Second roundFriday, March 29, 1985Source:

Third roundSaturday, March 30, 1985Source:

Final roundSunday, March 31, 1985''

References

External links
The Players Championship website

1985
1985 in golf
1985 in American sports
1985 in sports in Florida
March 1985 sports events in the United States